The Embassy of Zimbabwe in Russia is located in Moscow in the Yakimanka District on Mytnaya Street.

Diplomatic relations 
Diplomatic relations between the Soviet Union and Zimbabwe were established on February 18, 1981. Zimbabwe recognized the Russian Federation as the successor state of the Soviet Union.

Ambassadors 

 Agrippa Mutambara (2001-2005)
 Phelekezela Mphoko (2005-2010)
 Boniface Chidyausiku (2011-2015)
 Mike Nicholas Sango (From July 2015)

See also 
 List of diplomatic missions of Zimbabwe
 Russia–Zimbabwe relations

References

Links 
 Russian Foreign Ministry. Republic of Zimbabwe (Information)

Zimbabwe
Diplomatic missions of Zimbabwe
Russia–Zimbabwe relations